Citytv  is a Colombian free-to-air television channel, owned by El Tiempo Casa Editorial (ETCE), owner of the newspaper of the same name. ETCE licensed the Canadian brand Citytv from CHUM Limited (later sold off to Rogers). It began broadcasting on March 19, 1999 on UHF channel 21 in Bogotá. The channel is a member of Asomedios. It broadcasts for the metropolitan area of Bogotá and the department of Cundinamarca.

History 

Some programs of the original Citytv (such as MuchMusic and Electric Circus, whose Colombian versions are Mucha Música and Circo Eléctrico) were adapted to the local audience, while others such as Fashion TV or SeXTV were dubbed until 2007.

It also follows the philosophy of the original Citytv: on its newscasts (such as City Noticias and the morning show Arriba Bogotá) the presenters read the news standing up, just like at the Toronto headquarters.

In 1999, with the birth of the channel, Sin Cédula stood out, broadcast Monday through Friday from 4:30 to 5:00 p.m. This program stood out for giving importance to all the schools that are located in the Bogotá capital. They also broadcast cartoons like Oggy and the Cockroaches and Space Goofs.

After 8 years of transmission, in 2007, this program would be replaced by Zonalocha, a youth space that would be the same as its predecessor Without Cédula, the incorporation of anime to the channel's programming grid during this period stands out, in addition blocks would be born such as Nikneim and El Toque, where they were in charge of showing activities that would now be part of the university world, something that previously Citytv only showed but with the schools of all the towns of Bogotá.

In 2009 Cool's Cool was born, a program dedicated solely to school activities that exist throughout the city, but in 2011 this program would be replaced by Nick City, a program dedicated to animations and live actions of the American channel Nickelodeon. besides talking about activities of colleges and universities.

In 2013 Citytv launched Intervention Colombia and announces an alliance with A & E. 5

On September 6, 2017, the channel launched the new image and the new slogan on the occasion of Pope Francis' visit to Colombia and with the arrival of Claudia Palacios to the channel, who left office in 2019.

Information system 

Since 1999, Citytv has had an information system, in the mornings, Arriba Bogotá, in the afternoons and at nights CityNoticias and on Saturdays in the nights Noctámbulos de la City.

News 
 Arriba Bogotá: Morning newscast hosted by Sandra Vélez and Juan David Agudelo.
 CityNoticias Mediodía: Noon newscast hosted by Sandra Vélez.
 CityNoticias de las 8: Nightly newscast hosted by Jhonatan Nieto.
 CityNoticias FDS: Newscast on weekends and holidays hosted by Gabriela Cardenas.
 Sala de Redacción: Hosted by Darío Restrepo.
 Noctámbulos de la  City: Nightly news broadcast every Saturday.

Magazine 
Citytv broadcasts the morning magazine Bravíssimo every Saturday, Sunday and holidays at 7:30 A.M.

Channel faces 
 Darío Restrepo
 Jhonatan Nieto
 Martha Noriega
 Monica Molano
 María Beatriz Echandía
 Aníbal Alvarado
 Daniel Rincón
 Wilson Vega
 Julio César Guzmán
 Carlos Francisco Fernández
 Luisa Fernanda López
 Marcelo Cezán
 José Antonio Sánchez
 Sandra Velez
 Edmer Tovar
 Jimena Hoyos
 Victor Castro Gomez
 Mauricio Gallego
 Johanna Palacios
 Valentina Cortés
 Gabriela Cárdenas

Logos

Slogans 

 1999-2017:  Por todo Bogotá 
 2009:  Citytv, 10 años 
 2009–2011:  Dónde vives 
 2014:  Citytv, 15 años 
 Since 2017:  Tu mundo aquí 
 2019–2020:  20 años. Tus historias, nuestra historia 
 2020:  Tus historias, nuestra historia

Announcers 

Fernando Manrique

Main announcer

1999–2000

Félix Riaño

Main announcer

2001–2017

Gonzalo Rojas

Main announcer

2017–present

References

External links
  Citytv Bogotá
  Casa Editorial El Tiempo Official Site

Spanish-language television stations
Television stations in Colombia
Television channels and stations established in 1999
Mass media in Bogotá
Bogota
Television networks in Colombia
1999 establishments in Colombia